Fotbal Club Dinamo București II, commonly known as Dinamo București II or simply Dinamo II, was the reserve squad of Romanian football side FC Dinamo București.

History
One of the greatest performances in the history of the club was eliminating first league team Politehnica Timișoara with 3–2 in the sixteenths-finals phase of the 2004–05 Romanian Cup edition. They were eliminated in the next phase of the competition by FC Universitatea Craiova after losing with 3–2.

From 2007, Dinamo managed to keep its place in the second division, being close to relegation in 2010, when the team finished 15th, only one point above the relegation zone.

Across the years, the team was managed by former big players of the first squad: Ion Moldovan, Ionel Augustin, Dumitru Moraru, Costel Orac, Liviu Ciobotariu, Flavius Stoican, Ion Marin, Florentin Petre or Florin Bratu.

Dinamo II is a launching platform for players from the youth sector of the Bucharest club. During the years, players like Adrian Scarlatache, Ștefan Radu, Adrian Ropotan, Cristian Pulhac, Zié Diabaté, Marius Alexe, Constantin Nica or Nicolae Mitea made their breakthrough in football for the team.

Dinamo II relegated to the third division of Romanian football at the end of the 2012–13 season.

In the sixteenths-finals phase of the Cupa României 2016–17 edition Dinamo II played against their first team, Dinamo București, the game ending with a 2–1 loss for Dinamo II.

In the summer of 2017, Dinamo București owner, Ionuț Negoiță retired the team from Liga III and then dissolved it after 14 years of existence.

On 17 August 2020, only days after Negoiță sold the club to Benel International SA, the Spanish company decided to refound the second team, name it Dinamo B and to register to the Liga III.

In 2022, after the relegation to the Liga IV, Dinamo II was dissolved.

Honours
Liga III
Winners (1): 2006–07

League history

References

External links
 Official website

2
Defunct football clubs in Romania
Football clubs in Bucharest
Association football clubs established in 2003
Association football clubs disestablished in 2022
2003 establishments in Romania
2022 disestablishments in Romania
Liga II clubs
Liga III clubs